Cezary Morawski (born 5 June 1954 in Szczecin) is a Polish film, theatre and television actor, as well as a voiceover provider for film dubbing and video games.

Biography 
He is the son of the Polish actor Tomasz Morawski. In 1977 he graduated from the Aleksander Zelwerowicz National Academy of Dramatic Art in Warsaw. He is linked with two theatres in Warsaw – the Contemporary Theatre and the Common Theatre (Powszechny in pol.). He is also a lecturer at his alma mater.

In 2000 he was awarded the Order of Polonia Restituta for his achievements in social activities and charity for the artistic community. For his role in the play My Soul (Moja Dusza in pol.) he was handed, by President Lech Walesa, the honorary title of the Ambassador of the Siberians awarded by the World Congress of Siberians. Morawski is also one of the heroes in the book "The Power of everyday life" – Siła codzienności.

Personal life 
He is married to a Polish actress.

Bibliography 
 
 Cezary Morawski on Filmweb.pl (pol.)
 Cezary Morawski on filmpolski.pl (pol.)
 Cezary Morawski  on stopklatka.pl (pol.)
 Cezary Morawski na zdjęciach in the Polish National Film Archives (pol.)

Polish male film actors
Polish male stage actors
1954 births
Living people
Knights of the Order of Polonia Restituta
Artists from Białystok